The War with Mexico is a book by Justin Harvey Smith. It won the 1920 Pulitzer Prize for History.

References

External links 
 
 
 

1919 non-fiction books
Pulitzer Prize for History-winning works
American history books
Mexican–American War
American political books
Macmillan Publishers books